The Santana 525 is an American sailboat that was designed by W. Shad Turner as a one design and International Offshore Rule Quarter Ton class racer-cruiser and first built in 1977.

Production
The design was built by W. D. Schock Corp in the United States, between 1977 and 1982, with 261 boats completed, but it is now out of production.

Design
The Santana 525 is a racing keelboat, built predominantly of fiberglass, with wood trim. It has a fractional sloop rig, a raked stem, a reverse transom, an internally mounted spade-type rudder controlled by a tiller and a fixed fin keel. It displaces  and carries  of ballast.

The design has sleeping accommodation for four people, with a double "V"-berth in the bow cabin and a two straight settee berths in the main cabin. The galley is located on both sides of the companionway ladder. The head is located in the bow cabin, centered under the "V"-berth.

For sailing the design may be equipped with on of a number of jibs and genoas.

Operational history
The boat is supported by an active class club that organizes racing events, the Santana 525 One Design Class Association.

The largest fleet of Santana 525s is in Kelowna, British Columbia, Canada.

See also
List of sailing boat types

References

External links

Photo of a Santana 525 showing the keel and hull shape

Keelboats
1970s sailboat type designs
Sailing yachts
Sailboat type designs by W. Shad Turner
Sailboat types built by W. D. Schock Corp